Guy, Bishop of Amiens (d.1075) was an eleventh-century churchman, in what is now the north-east of France.

Although the genealogy of early Ponthieu and Boulogne is scanty (and the 12th century versions unreliable, because of their efforts to tie the ruling houses of Boulogne and Ponthieu into earlier noble houses), it is most likely that Guy,  the Bishop of Amiens, was the uncle (and not the brother) of Enguerrand II and his brother Guy I of Ponthieu. Count Enguerrand II's and Guy I's father Hugh II was the son of Enguerrand I by an earlier marriage: Enguerrand I evidently married a Boulognnais countess, the wife of Arnold II, who died in battle: from this later marriage came Guy and his brother Fulk (later abbot of Forest l'Abbaye), and probably a Robert.

Career
Bishop Guy was educated for a career in the church at the abbey of St Riquier and was one of its most brilliant students. His teacher was abbot Enguerrand (called "the wise" d. 9 December 1045). Guy may have been an archdeacon by 1045, and was bishop by 1058. "His predecessor to the episcopate of Amiens, Fulk II, was caught up in the emerging struggle between the secular clergy, dominated by the political contentions of the great feudal families, and the reforming popes, with their bias in favour of monastic houses, which they often rendered exempt from episcopal jurisdiction." When Guy became bishop of Amiens he inherited the legal struggles of his predecessor; this eventually resulted in Guy being suspended from his duties as bishop, although he continued to rule the see as lord.

He was in this state of papal disfavour at the time of the Norman Conquest. This may have been the (contributing) reason why bishop Guy composed the Carmen de Hastingae Proelio (Song of the Battle of Hastings), as an effort to flatter the new Norman king of England, William I, who was then in very high favor with the pope. But if so, bishop Guy's poem failed in its purpose. He was highly enough thought of at the Norman court to be assigned as Matilda of Flanders's chaplain when she went over to England for her coronation in 1068. But when bishop Guy died in 1075, he still had not regained his bishopric.

References

Sources

The Carmen de Hastingae Proelio of Bishop Guy of Amiens, edited by Catherine Morton and Hope Muntz, Oxford at the Clarendon Press, 1972.
The Carmen de Hastingae Proelio of Bishop Guy of Amiens, edited and translated by Frank Barlow, Clarendon Press, Oxford, 1999.

1075 deaths
11th-century French Roman Catholic bishops
Bishops of Amiens
Year of birth unknown
11th-century Latin writers
11th-century French writers